No Man's Land: The Rise of Reeker (Reeker 2 in the UK) is a 2008 American supernatural slasher film about a sheriff and his son who are tracking down a group of bank robbers on their way to Mexico, only to discover that they are being stalked by a far more deadly enemy — The Reeker. It is a sequel to Reeker (2005).

The film released to DVD on October 14, 2008.

Cast

Production
The film's exteriors were filmed in Lancaster, California and the interiors were filmed in Los Angeles, California. The whole movie was set in Death Valley, a desert in California located southeast of the Sierra Nevada range in the Great Basin and the Mojave Desert.

Reception
David Nusair from Reel Film.com gave the film one out of four stars, criticizing the film's lack of compelling characters which he called "one dimensional", and lack of suspense.

References

External links
Official Website

 
 

2008 films
2008 horror films
2000s slasher films
American supernatural horror films
American slasher films
Films set in California
Films set in deserts
Death Valley
Films about personifications of death
Films about capital punishment
2000s English-language films
Films directed by Dave Payne
2000s American films